Curt James Haydn (February 12, 1919 – March 31, 1999) was a Norwegian bobsledder who competed in the early 1950s. At the 1952 Winter Olympics in Oslo, he finished 12th in the four-man and 14th in the two-man events.

References
1952 bobsleigh two-man results
1952 bobsleigh four-man results
James Haydn's profile at Sports Reference.com

1919 births
1999 deaths
Bobsledders at the 1952 Winter Olympics
Norwegian male bobsledders